Biffarius is a genus of ghost shrimp in the family Callianassidae, containing species formerly included in the genus Callianassa. Its members are small and generally live in the intertidal zone. In April 2020, a new species was described from the northeastern Brazilian coast. Biffarius was named in honour of Thomas A. Biffar, and includes the following species:
Biffarius arenosus (Poore, 1975)
Biffarius biformis (Biffar, 1971)
Biffarius botterae (Hernáez, Miranda & Tavares, 2020)
Biffarius ceramicus (Fulton & Grant, 1906)
Biffarius debilis Hernandez-Aguilera, 1998
Biffarius delicatulus Rodrigues & Manning, 1992
Biffarius filholi (A. Milne-Edwards, 1878)
Biffarius fragilis (Biffar, 1970)
Biffarius lewtonae (Ngoc-Ho, 1994)
Biffarius melissae Poore, 2008
Biffarius pacificus Guzman & Thadje, 2003
Biffarius poorei (Sakai, 1999)

References

Thalassinidea
Taxa named by Raymond B. Manning